Frank R. Pignanelli  is an American politician who served in the Utah House of Representatives from 1987 through 1997, serving as minority leader and minority whip for parts of that tenure. In 2003, he, unsuccessfully, ran for mayor of Salt Lake City.

Early life
Pignanelli is a native Utah resident, growing up in Salt Lake City.

In high school, Pignanelli partook in competitive debate.

He received a Juris Doctor degree from the University of Utah College of Law. Before being elected to the Utah House of Representatives, he was a lawyer at the Salt Lake City law firm Gustin, Adams, Kasting & Liapis. He as alspo the treasurer of the Salt Lake County Democratic Party and the chairman of the finance committee for the Young Lawyers Section of the Utah State Bar. In 1985, he had been the campaign manager for Sydney Fonnesbeck's successful Salt Lake City Council campaign.

Utah House of Representatives
In 1986, he was elected to the Utah House of Representatives' 23rd district. He was reelected to the district in 1988 and 1990. In 1992 he was redistricted, and was elected to the 24th district. He would win reelection to this district in 1994.

In November 1988, the Utah House of Representatives' Democratic caucus voted to make Pignanelli its party whip for the then-upcoming 1989–1990 session, thus, selecting him to be the minority whip.

In 1990, he was elected to the 24th district of the Utah House. He would be reelected to it

In late 1990, the Utah House of Representatives' Democratic caucus voted to make Pignanelli its party leader for the then-upcoming 1991–1992 session, thus, selecting him to serve as the minority leader. He would retain this position through the 1995–1996 session.

Subsequent career
In 2003, he, unsuccessfully, ran for mayor of Salt Lake City

References

Democratic Party members of the Utah House of Representatives
Politicians from Salt Lake City
Lawyers from Salt Lake City
S.J. Quinney College of Law alumni